Blaris is a civil parish covering areas of both County Antrim and County Down, Northern Ireland. It is situated in the historic baronies of Castlereagh Upper and Iveagh Lower, Upper Half in County Down and Massereene Upper in County Antrim. It is also a townland of 543 acres, which contains the site of the Blaris medieval parish church, and is on the south-east side of the River Lagan, adjacent to Lisburn.

History
In the 1306 Papal Taxation the church is recorded as Ecclesia de Blaris. In 1605 the townland of Blaris is recorded as Ballytempleblarisse,. In the mid-19th century the antiquarian William Reeves noted that very little of the church was intact, although the graveyard remained.

Blaris old burial ground is in the townland of Blaris and is reputed to have had a church in mediaeval times. The oldest gravestone dates from 1626. Some of those who took part in the Irish Rebellion of 1798 were executed outside the graveyard and are buried in an unmarked plot.

Settlements
The civil parish contains the following settlements:
Lisburn
Lurganure
Maze
Ravernet

Townlands
The civil parish contains the following townlands:

Aghnatrisk
Annacloy
Ballintine
Ballykeel Edenagonnell
Ballymullan
Blaris
Broughmore
Carnbane
Carnreagh
Culcavy
Drumatihugh
Duneight
Gortnacor
Knockmore
Largymore
Lisnagarvy
Lisnatrunk
Lisnoe
Lissue (also known as Teraghafeeva)
Lurganure
Magherageery
Maze
Old Warren
Ravernet
Taghnabrick
Teraghafeeva (also known as Lissue)
Tonagh

See also
List of civil parishes of County Down

References